Gerard Ian Evan FRS, FMedSci (born 17 August 1955) is a British biologist and, since May 2022, Professor of Cancer Biology at King's College London and a principal group leader in the Francis Crick Institute. Prior to this he was Sir William Dunn Professor and Head of Biochemistry at the University of Cambridge (2009-2022).

Education
Evan was educated at St Peter's College, Oxford, where he studied Biochemistry, and King's College, Cambridge, where he was awarded his PhD in 1982 for research using Monoclonal antibodies.

Research
Evan does research to the determine the molecular basis of cancer.

Career
Prior to Cambridge, Evan was Royal Society Napier Professor at University College London and the Imperial Cancer Research Fund (1988-99), then Gerson & Barbara Bass Bakar Distinguished Professor of Cancer Biology, at University of California, San Francisco (1999-2011).

References

External links

20th-century British biologists
21st-century British biologists
British biochemists
Fellows of Christ's College, Cambridge
Fellows of the Royal Society
Living people
Sir William Dunn Professors of Biochemistry
Cancer researchers
Alumni of St Peter's College, Oxford
Alumni of King's College, Cambridge
University of California, San Francisco faculty
Fellows of the Academy of Medical Sciences (United Kingdom)
1955 births
Francis Crick Institute alumni